Popoudina linea is a moth of the family Erebidae. It was described by Francis Walker in 1855. It is found in Ethiopia, Kenya and South Africa.

References

 

Spilosomina
Moths described in 1855
Moths of Sub-Saharan Africa